George Francis Cheverko (July 29, 1920 – November 14, 1977) was an American football running back in the National Football League for the New York Giants and the Washington Redskins. He played college football at Fordham University and was drafted in the seventh round of the 1944 NFL Draft by the Cleveland Rams. Cheverko was inducted into the Fordham University Hall of Fame in 1978.

References

1920 births
1977 deaths
People from Carbon County, Pennsylvania
American football running backs
Fordham Rams football players
New York Giants players
Washington Redskins players
Players of American football from Pennsylvania